
Gmina Orońsko is a rural gmina (administrative district) in Szydłowiec County, Masovian Voivodeship, in east-central Poland.

Villages
Gmina Orońsko contains the villages and settlements of Bąków, Chałupki Łaziskie, Chronów, Chronów-Kolonia Dolna, Chronów-Kolonia Górna, Chronówek, Ciepła, Dobrut, Gozdków, Guzów, Guzów-Kolonia, Helenów, Krogulcza Mokra, Krogulcza Sucha, Łaziska, Orońsko, Śniadków, Tomaszów, Wałsnów and Zaborowie.

Neighbouring gminas
Gmina Orońsko is bordered by the gminas of Jastrząb, Kowala, Szydłowiec, Wieniawa, Wierzbica and Wolanów.

References
Polish official population figures 2006

Oronsko
Szydłowiec County